Frederick William Rains (c. 1860 – 3 December 1945) was a British actor and film director. He was the father of the actor Claude Rains.

Selected filmography
Actor
 The Broken Melody (1916)
 The New Clown (1916)
 The Marriage of William Ashe (1916)
 Sally in Our Alley (1916)
 Sally Bishop (1916)
 A Welsh Singer (1916)
 Land of My Fathers (1921)
 Expiation (1922)
 Little Brother of God (1922)
 A Rogue in Love (1922)
 The Lady Owner (1923)
 The Audacious Mr. Squire (1923)
 Mist in the Valley (1923)
 The Indian Love Lyrics (1923)
 The Money Habit (1924)
 The Conspirators (1924)
 Nell Gwyn (1926)
 The Only Way (1927)
 The Inseparables (1929)
 The Runaway Princess (1929)
 The Clue of the New Pin (1929)
 Stepping Stones (1931)
 Verdict of the Sea (1932)
 A Royal Demand (1933)
 The Broken Rosary (1934)
 Chick (1936)

Director
 Land of My Fathers (1921)

References

External links
 
 
 
 

1860s births
1945 deaths
English male film actors
English male silent film actors
English film directors
Male actors from London
20th-century English male actors